Dr. Hoch's Konservatorium – Musikakademie was founded in Frankfurt am Main on 22 September 1878.  Through the generosity of Frankfurter Joseph Hoch, who bequeathed the Conservatory one million German gold marks in his testament, a school for music and the arts was established for all age groups.  Instrumental to the foundation, prosperity and success of the conservatory was its director Joachim Raff who did most of the work including setting the entire curriculum and hiring all its faculty.  It has played an important role in the history of music in Frankfurt. Clara Schumann taught piano, as one of distinguished teachers in the late 19th century, gaining international renown for the conservatory. In the 1890s, about 25% of the students came from other countries: 46 were from England and 23 from the United States.

In the 1920s, under director Bernhard Sekles, the conservatory was far ahead of its time: Sekles initiated the world's first Jazz Studies (directed by Mátyás Seiber) and in 1931 the Elementary Music Department.

Dr. Hoch's conservatory offers instruction in the Music Education for Youth and Adults (ANE) program, the Elementary Music Department (Basisabteilung), and the Pre-College-Frankfurt (PCF) program, which provides preparation for future studies at a Hochschule or conservatory. There are also Ballet, Early Music and New Music departments. The following qualifications are available: Bachelor of Music in Performance and Pedagogy in all instruments, voice, music theory, composition, performance and Elementary Music Pedagogy.

Chronology 

 1857: 14 July: Dr. Joseph Hoch (1815–74) makes the conservatory foundation the main heir of his fortune.
 1874: Dr. Hoch dies on 19 September.
 1876: The foundation is officially recognized (16 March).
 1877: 16 February: Recognition of the foundation's governing body by the Frankfurt Magistrate, Chairman Dr. Heinrich Mumm von Schwarzenstein (until 1890).
 June: Joachim Raff elected first director.
 1878: 22 September: Opening ceremony in the Frankfurt Saalhof.
 20 October: Clara Schumann's 50th anniversary as a performer.
 1879: 10 February: first internal student concert.
 9 June: Frankfurt visit by Franz Liszt.
 1880: Differences between Raff and Julius Stockhausen, who resigns on 1 September.
 1882: Joachim Raff dies on 24 June. His successor, Bernhard Scholz, appointed on 11. November.
 1883: 21. January: Secession of the followers of Raff, which leads in April to the opening of the Raff-Konservatorium.
 21. March: Bernhard Scholz takes over as director.
 1884: Julius Stockhausen resigns for a second time (1 April).
 September: Opening of the Seminar (Director: Iwan Knorr).
1886: September: Opening of the pre-school: Hans Pfitzner studies (with scholarship) until 1890.
 1888: 29. April: Inauguration of the new conservatory building.
 1890: Dr. Theodor Mettenheimer takes over the chairmanship of the governors. State subvention for 2 scholarships. Engelbert Humperdincks begins teaching (1890–97).
 1892: Clara Schumann retires. The conservatory takes over the training for the scholarships of the Mozart-Foundation.
 1896: Clara Schumann dies on 20 May.
 1901: Heinrich Hanau becomes chairman of the governors (until 1904).
 1904: Emil Sulzbach called to be chairman (until 1923).
 1908: Bernhard Scholz resigns. Iwan Knorr becomes director. Opening of the Orchestra School.
 1909: Paul Hindemith receives a scholarship and is accepted as a student of Rebner.
 1916: Iwan Knorr dies 22 January. In September Waldemar von Baußnern takes over as director.
 1918: Opening of the Singing School Seminar.
 1921: Tension between the governors and director. Inflation forces the foundation to ask for subventions from the city and the state of Hesse. Plans for a "Hochschule" for Frankfurt (Leo Kestenberg).
 1923: 27 April Waldemar von Bausznern retires. Hermann Scherchen applies for the job of director. Resignation of Emil Sulzbach.
 1924: Bernhard Sekles appointed director. Opening of the Opera School. Dr. Oswald Feis becomes chairman of the foundation.
 1926: Seminar for private music teachers and »Conservatory for listeners of Music« opened.
 1928: Opening of the first academic Jazz classes anywhere under the direction of Mátyás Seiber. Concerts held in the "Volksbildungsheim" (Hermann von Schmeidel).
 1931: Courses in Children's Musical Pedagogy.
 1933: Dismissal of the director Bernhard Sekles and all Jewish and foreign teachers (10 April).
 Dr. Hans Rumpf becomes chairman of the foundation and Bertil Wetzelsberger director.
 17 October: Opening of the »Hochschule für Musik und Theater der Stadt Frankfurt am Main« without permission of the Ministry of Culture. Growing influence of Artistic Director Hans Meißner.
 1936: Hermann Reutter becomes director.
 1937: 19 October: Contract between the City of Frankfurt and the foundation Dr. Hoch's Konservatorium concerning the establishing of a state "Hochschule" for Music.
 1938: 1 April: Opening of the state "Hochschule". The conservatory degraded to a pre-school.
 1943: 4 October: the Conservatory building is hit by aircraft bombing. Move to the Passavant-Gontard'sche Palais.
 1944: February: Passavant-Gontard'sche Palais also destroyed.
 1947: Reopening of the Department of Church Music in April and the Department of School Music in the autumn.
 1950: Walther Davisson becomes Artistic Director of the "Hochschule".
 1951: Recommencing of teaching in a building constructed on the ruins at Eschenheimer Landstr. 4. Chairman of the foundation also functions as city councillor.
 1954: A board  of directors installed for the Musikhochschule and the Conservatory.
 1958: Philipp Mohler becomes director of the unified "Hochschule" and Dr. Hoch's Konservatorium.
 1967: The Frankfurt Magistrate nullifies the 1937 contract.
 1971: Plans for joining the conservatory with the Musikhochschule cause resistance. The conservatory becomes a stepping stone between a music school and the Musikhochschule.
 1973: Philipp Mohler resigns as director of the conservatory. Klaus Volk becomes director of the unified Conservatory and Musikhochschule.
 1977: Klaus Volk resigns. Prof. Hans Dieter Resch, rector of the "Musikhochschule", becomes provisional director, and in 1978 Alois Kottmann.
 1979: Frank Stähle becomes director. Under his direction the conservatory is restructured and again becomes an institute for training professional musicians.
Move to the Philanthropin takes place in stages: 1986–1989.
 1989: Move to Philanthropin completed. Opening ceremonies on 9 February. Stadträtin Jutta Ebeling replaces Bernhard Mihm as chairperson of the foundation.
 2002: Dr. Hoch's Konservatorium is given the status of Music Academy.
 2005: Move to the newly built Education Center Ostend (BZO).
 2007: Frank Stähle retires and Werner Wilde becomes provisional director for one year.
 2008: Mario Liepe is appointed director.

Directors 

 1878–1882: Joseph Joachim Raff
 1883–1908: Bernhard Scholz
 1908–1916: Iwan Knorr
 1916–1923: Waldemar von Baußnern (also: von Bausznern)
 1924–1933: Bernhard Sekles
 1933–1936: 
 1936–1944: Hermann Reutter
 1950–1954: Walther Davisson
 1954–1958: Helmut Walcha, Erich Flinsch, 
 1958–1973: 
 1973–1977: Klaus Volk
 1977–1979: Hans Dieter Resch, Alois Kottmann
 1979–2007: Frank Stähle
 2007–2008: Werner Wilde (Provisional director)
 2008–2018: Mario Liepe
 2018–2022: Christian Heynisch, Caroline Prassel, Karin Franke-André (directorate)
 since 2022: Fabian Rieser, Caroline Prassel, Karin Franke-André (directorate)

Teachers and students

Distinguished teachers 

 1878–1910: Bernhard Cossmann
 1878–1904: Hugo Heermann
 1878–1880: Carl Heymann
 1878–1882: Joachim Raff
 1878–1892: Clara Schumann
 1878–1880 and 1883–84: Julius Stockhausen
 1878–1883: Anton Urspruch
 1882–1907: Lazzaro Uzielli
 1883–1908: Iwan Knorr
 1883–1902: James Kwast
 1884–1923: Ernst Engesser
 1890–1897: Engelbert Humperdinck
 1893–1904: Carl Friedberg (also: Karl)
 1894–1906: Hugo Becker
 1895–1897: Marie Hanfstängl
 1896–1933: Bernhard Sekles
 1899–1912: Johannes Hegar
 1904–1908: Hermann Zilcher
 1904–1907 and 1908–1933: Adolf Rebner
 1905–1906: Johannes Messchaert (also: Johan)
 1906–1933: 
 1908–1916 and 1929–1942: Alfred Hoehn
 1912–1917: Margarete Dessoff
 1926–1928: Hermine Bosetti
 1926–1932: Ludwig Rottenberg
 1928–1933: Mátyás Seiber (Director of the first academic Jazz department)
 1930–1933: Herbert Graf (Opera School)
 1933–1938: Helmut Walcha
 1933–1942: Kurt Hessenberg
 1933–1945: 
 1936–1940: Anton Biersack
 1954–1974: 
 1958–19??: Alois Kottmann
 1976–1982:  Albert Mangelsdorff
 1985–1996: Richard Rudolf Klein
 1981–2000: Gerhard Schedl

Distinguished students 

 1879–1882: Edward MacDowell
 1886–1890: Hans Pfitzner
 1891–1893 and 1896–1899: Cyril Scott (Frankfurt Group)
 1893–1895: Margarete Dessoff
 1893–1897: Norman O'Neill (Frankfurt Group)
 1894–1896: Henry Balfour Gardiner (Frankfurt Group)
 1894–1901: Walter Braunfels
 1895–1900: Percy Grainger (Frankfurt Group)
 1895–1903: Johanna Senfter
 1895–1898: Hans Jelmoli
 1897–1901: Roger Quilter (Frankfurt Group)
 1898–1903: Boris Hambourg
 1900–1901: Ernest Bloch
 1901–1902: Otto Klemperer
 1903–1909: Reinhard Oppel
 1904–1907: Hans Gebhard-Elsaß
 1904–1908: Frederick Septimus Kelly
 1908–1910: Richard Tauber
 1909–1917: Paul Hindemith
 1909–1913: Ernst Toch
 1913–1916 and 1918–1920: Ottmar Gerster
 ca. 1915 : Hans Rosbaud
 1917–1931: Kurt Hessenberg
 1924–1927: Alexander Schneider

Teachers 
 Alma Moodie
 since 2005: Barbara Zechmeister

Students 

 
 Frederic Austin
 
 
 Franz Magnus Böhme
 Leonard Borwick
 Catherine Carswell
 Torsten de Winkel
 Moritz Eggert
 
 Ernst Fischer
 Clemens von und zu Franckenstein
 Oskar Fried
 Else Gentner-Fischer
 
 Konrad Georg
 
 Ria Ginster
 
 Daniel Hensel
 
 
 Alfred Hollins
 Erich Itor Kahn
 
 
 Christof Lauer
 Tiana Lemnitz
 Uli Lenz
 Emil Mangelsdorff
 Annette Marquard
 Heinz Moog
 
 Walter Rehberg
 Max Rudolf
 Fritzi Scheff
 Erich Schmid
 
 Johanna Senfter
 Hermine Spies
 Rudi Stephan
 Stefan Thomas
 Richard Trunk
 Hans-Jürgen von Bose
 Hermann Hans Wetzler
 Heike Matthiesen

Legacy 

The German Federal Bank honored the conservatory on the reverse side of the former 100 DM bill with a picture of the original conservatory building, unfortunately bombed in World War II. Clara Schumann, the first piano teacher, is pictured on the front side of the bill.

References 

 Stiftung Dr. Hoch's Konservatorium Joseph Hoch zum 100. Todestag, Frankfurt am Main: Kramer, 1974.
 Peter Cahn, Das Hoch'sche Konservatorium in Frankfurt am Main (1878–1978), Frankfurt am Main: Kramer, 1979. Chronology until 1978 used with kind permission of Dr. Peter Cahn, Frankfurt (translation by Edmund Brownless).
 Festschrift 125 Jahre Stiftung Dr. Hoch's Konservatorium Frankfurt am Main, Frankfurt am Main, 2003.
 Baker's Biographical Dictionary of Musicians, (Nicolas Slonimsky, Hrsg.) New York: G. Schirmer, 1958

External links 
 
 The early reception of Jazz in Germany: Mátyás Seiber and the Jazz Orchester of the Hoch Conservatory in a radio recording from 1931
 The first jazz theory class, ever, wasn't offered in the United States—it was at the Hoch Conservatory in Frankfurt, Germany
  Dr. Hoch's Konservatorium seit Januar Musikakademie / Bericht vom Festakt zur Verleihung des Status einer Akademie (in German) Online Musik Magazin, 6 February 2002
 Sonja Stöhr: Dr. Hoch's Konservatorium / Dr. Hoch's Talentschmiede Frankfurter Rundschau 12. April 2016

 
Music in Frankfurt
Universities and colleges in Frankfurt
Educational institutions established in 1878
1878 establishments in Germany